Stapelia flavopurpurea is a species of plant in the family Apocynaceae. It is endemic to Namibia. The flowers produced by the plant are quite unusual. They range from a bright yellow to greenish color and smell of beeswax.

References

flavopurpurea
Flora of Namibia